Mirkan is a town in Badakhshan Province in north-eastern Afghanistan.

Nearby towns and villages include Ambadara (0.8 miles), Sabz Darreh (2.2 miles), Robat (3.7 miles) and Bakhtingan (7.0 miles).

See also
Badakhshan Province

References

External links 
Satellite map at Maplandia.com 

Populated places in Tagab District